The Spotted Dog is a Grade II listed public house at 212 Upton Lane, Forest Gate, London. It dates back to the late 15th or early 16th century, and was thought to once have been a hunting lodge for King Henry VIII.

History
Leopold Wagner's 1921 book A New Book About London writes of a "huge barn-like structure in the vegetable garden ... (of the pub) ... wantonly sacrificed by the new proprietors in the interest of a bottling store ... (which had) ... anciently enclosed the kennels for a pack of royal hounds".  He asserts that when Henry VIII followed the chase in the Essex (Epping) Forest, he "took up the hounds here at Upton" about a mile from the toll-gate which subsequently led to the residential district being named Forest Gate.

Some credence can be attached to this tale because having dissolved Stratford Langthorne Abbey in 1538 and seized all of its enormous land holdings in the borough Henry Vlll used his own money to purchase the nearby Hamfrith Wood from its owner, Sir Anthony Hungerford – presumably to facilitate his love of hunting. Mr Wagner provides some intriguing details in support of his account stating that what became the Spotted Dog was at the time the residence of Henry's Master of the Hounds, who was granted the privilege of taking personal profit for refreshing travellers passing that way.

The author asserts that on this account until the Great War the Spotted Dog "stood alone among the inns of the country at large in having its licence direct from the Crown," adding that:

Development
The pub has been closed since June 2004, and is in a state of serious disrepair. In 2009, the London Fire Brigade posted a notice stating that it was a dangerous structure. A campaign group called Save the Spotted Dog, with support from the local MPs and Newham Council, called in 2014 for the pub to be either reinstated as a family pub, or for it to be used for as some other sort of community facility. In 2020 the council approved plans to renovate the pub and build a 68-room hotel next door to it.

See also
The Old Spotted Dog Ground

References

External links
Save the Spotted Dog campaign

Grade II listed buildings in the London Borough of Newham
Grade II listed pubs in London
Pubs in the London Borough of Newham
Forest Gate
Former pubs in London